Washburn Library, formerly Washburn Community Library, is a public library in the Hennepin County Library system. Designed by Brooks Cavin, an architect who studied under Walter Gropius and Eero Saarinen, Washburn reflected mid-century modernism. Set near Minnehaha Creek, Washburn meets the needs of Southwest Minneapolis in a picturesque neighborhood.
    
Patron traffic quickly rose and broke all records: to meet demand, library staff requested other branches to share their materials. Phonograph albums and children's books were particularly popular. In the first year of service, Washburn circulated 273,000 books, higher than any other Minneapolis Public Library (MPL) branch at the time. 
 
Named for William D. Washburn, who was a founder of Washburn-Crosby Milling Company, and a United States Senator, Washburn Library's public art includes a millstone, honoring Minneapolis' heritage as a grain milling center in the 19th and 20th centuries. The Washburn-Crosby Milling Company is now known as General Mills.

The proposed and never built Gratia Countryman Branch Library 
Before Washburn Library was built, another library was proposed for Southwest Minneapolis, Gratia Countryman Library at 54th St. and Penn Ave.

In 1959 the Minneapolis Public Library Board requested the City Council to acquire by condemnation a site for the new Gratia Countryman Branch Library. The desired land was in southwest Minneapolis in the vicinity of 54th St W. and Penn Ave S.

The proposed library was to be the first neighborhood library built by MPL since 1931, when the Linden Hills branch was built. It would serve an area of about 30,000 residents, who were currently accessing library services via the bookmobile and at the nearest branch, the Linden Hills library, several miles away. The Countryman library was also scheduled to be the first in an ambitious 20-year branch expansion program which would extend library services to areas of the city not already served.

The site for the proposed Gratia Countryman Library was selected due to the lack of library service in an area with prodigious growth. Bookmobiles were unable to meet the demand for books and information. In a library survey, MPL found that 37,373 books were circulated by bookmobiles throughout the proposed area during the period from January 1 to June 30, 1960. The new proposed branch would house 30,000 books, 100 periodicals, and more than 5,000 pamphlets and clippings.

The proposed 14,000 sq. ft. building was estimated to cost $327,000 for construction, planning, site, and equipment. The library selected Graffunder-Nagle & Associates, Inc. to design the structure. Preliminary plans were approved by the library board in November, 1960.

But this is where the plans ended. The legislature passed funding for the separate Hennepin County Library system in order to serve the growing suburban population, but rejected plans for growth in the city system. MPL struggled financially and lacked sufficient funds to continue its 20-year branch expansion program. The proposed Gratia Countryman Library was put on hold and then dropped. In June, 1966, the Library Board voted to offer for sale the library property at 54th St. and Penn Ave S. for a minimum price of $37,500. The property was sold in 1969 for $18,400.

The desire to honor Gratia Countryman by naming a library after her continued. In 1984, the Library Board discussed the renaming of North Regional Library and in 2000, East Lake Library was suggested.

Updates to the library

Approaching its 20th anniversary in 1989, the Washburn branch needed to be expanded and updated to meet patrons' needs.   The community it served had expanded, including more children living in the neighborhoods, and demand was bustling for materials. In fact, it was the busiest of Minneapolis's 14 neighborhood branch libraries.

In 1990, Minneapolis Public Library leadership determined that the library was in need of significant remodeling and approved an expanded footprint of 18,965 square feet, a 28% increase.  In serving the neighborhoods of Lynnhurst, Kenny, Armatage, Tangletown, Windom, Field, Page, Hale and Diamond Lake, it was noted in particular that significant after-school use by children warranted improving services and spaces for their use.  The space needed to better meet the needs of the community's patrons:  deferred maintenance needed to be performed on the building, and technology upgrades were overdue.  Leonard Parker and Associates were chosen to develop the plans.

In 2014, a six-week long update to the building resulted in an open floor plan, more space for children and teens, new furniture and shelves, including technology tables for the public computers, and more electrical outlets for powering portable electronics.

Art at the library
Joining the millstone in the external landscape, the update to the Washburn added a sculpture by Ann Wolfe, Mother and Child, and a large and bright whimsical mural by Virginia Bradley on the domed ceiling above the children's area.

References

Minneapolis Public Library
Hennepin County Library
Library buildings completed in 1970
Libraries in Minnesota
Public libraries in Minnesota